Lama, Lamma, or Lamassu (Cuneiform: , ; Sumerian: lammař; later in Akkadian: lamassu; sometimes called a lamassus) is an Assyrian protective deity. 

Initially depicted as a goddess in Sumerian times, when it was called Lamma, it was later depicted from Assyrian times as a hybrid of a human, bird, and either a bull or lion—specifically having a human head, the body of a bull or a lion, and bird wings, under the name Lamassu. In some writings, it is portrayed to represent a goddess. A less frequently used name is shedu (Cuneiform: , ; Sumerian: alad; Akkadian, šēdu), which refers to the male counterpart of a lamassu. Lamassu represent the zodiacs, parent-stars or constellations.

Goddess Lama

The goddess Lama appears initially as a mediating goddess who precedes the orants and presents them to the deities. The protective deity is clearly labelled as Lam(m)a in a Kassite stele unearthed at Uruk, in the temple of Ishtar, goddess to which she had been dedicated by king Nazi-Maruttash (1307–1282 BC). It is a goddess wearing a ruffled dress and wearing a horned tiara symbolizing the deity, with two hands raised, in sign of prayer. A. Spycket proposed that similar female figures appearing in particular in glyptics and statuary from the Akkadian period, and in particular in the presentation scenes (common especially in the Paleo-Babylonian era) were to be considered as Lam(m)a. This opinion is commonly followed and in artistic terminology these female figures are generally referred to as Lam(m)a. From Assyrian times, Lamma becomes a hybrid deity, half-animal, half-human.

Iconography

From Assyrian times, lamassu were depicted as hybrids, with bodies of either winged bulls or lions and heads of human males. The motif of a winged animal with a human head is common to the Near East, first recorded in Ebla around 3000 BC. The first distinct lamassu motif appeared in Assyria during the reign of Tiglath-Pileser II as a symbol of power.

Assyrian sculpture typically placed prominent pairs of lamassu at entrances in palaces, facing the street and also internal courtyards. They were represented as "double-aspect" figures on corners, in high relief. From the front they appear to stand, and from the side, walk, and in earlier versions have five legs, as is apparent when viewed obliquely. Lumasi do not generally appear as large figures in the low-relief schemes running round palace rooms, where winged genie figures are common, but they sometimes appear within narrative reliefs, apparently protecting the Assyrians.

The colossal entrance figures were often followed by a hero grasping a wriggling lion, also colossal in scale and in high relief. In the palace of Sargon II at Dur-Sharrukin, a group of at least seven lamassu and two such heroes with lions surrounded the entrance to the "throne room", "a concentration of figures which produced an overwhelming impression of power." They also appear on cylinder seals. Notable examples include those at the Gate of All Nations at Persepolis in Iran, the British Museum in London, the Louvre in Paris, the National Museum of Iraq in Baghdad, the Metropolitan Museum of Art in New York, and the University of Chicago Oriental Institute. Several examples left in situ in northern Iraq were destroyed in the 2010s by the Islamic State of Iraq and the Levant when they occupied the area, as were those in the Mosul Museum.

Terminology
Lamassu represent the zodiacs, parent-stars, or constellations. They are depicted as protective deities because they encompass all life within them. In the Sumerian Epic of Gilgamesh, they are depicted as physical deities as well, which is where the lamassu iconography originates, physical representations or embodiments of divine higher principles associated with specific celestial origins. Although lamassu had a different iconography and portrayal in the culture of Sumer, the terms "lamassu", "alad", and "shedu" evolved throughout the Assyro-Akkadian culture from the Sumerian culture to denote the Assyrian-winged-man-bull symbol and statues during the Neo-Assyrian Empire. Eventually, female lamassu were identified as "apsasû". 

The motif of the Assyrian-winged-man-bull called Aladlammu and Lamassu interchangeably is not the lamassu or alad of Sumerian origin, which were depicted with different iconography. These monumental statues were called aladlammû or lamassu which meant "protective spirit". In Hittite, the Sumerian form  is used both as a name for the so-called "tutelary deity", identified in certain later texts with the goddess Inara, and a title given to similar protective deities.

Mythology

The lamassu is a celestial being from ancient Mesopotamian religion bearing a human head, bull's body, sometimes with the horns and the ears of a bull, and wings. It appears frequently in Mesopotamian art. The lamassu and shedu were household protective spirits of the common Assyrian people, becoming associated later as royal protectors, and were placed as sentinels at entrances. The Akkadians associated the god Papsukkal with a lamassu and the god Išum with shedu.

To protect houses, the lamassu were engraved in clay tablets, which were then buried under the door's threshold. They were often placed as a pair at the entrance of palaces. At the entrance of cities, they were sculpted in colossal size, and placed as a pair, one at each side of the door of the city, that generally had doors in the surrounding wall, each one looking toward one of the cardinal points.

In modern culture
The British 10th Army, which operated in Iraq and Iran in 1942–1943, adopted the lamassu as its insignia. A bearded man with a winged bull body appears on the logo of the United States Forces – Iraq.

A man with a bull's body is found among the creatures that make up Aslan's army in The Lion, the Witch, and the Wardrobe by C. S. Lewis. He appears at the Stone Table, challenging the White Witch "with a great bellowing voice". In the film Alexander (2004), lamassu are seen at the Ishtar Gate in Babylon. In the Disney film Aladdin (1992), a gold lamassu can be found in the scene where Aladdin and Abu enter the cave in the desert to find the lamp. And, in the "Star Wars" prequel: Star Wars: Episode II – Attack of the Clones, Lama Su is the name of the Kaminoan cloner who tells Obi-Wan Kenobi about Jango Fett being the clone army's template.

Michael Rakowitz, a Northwestern University professor of Art Theory & Practice, won a Fourth Plinth commission to recreate the Lamassu that stood in Nineveh, Iraq, from 700 BC until it was destroyed by ISIS in 2015. Rakowitz's sculpture will be displayed in London's Trafalgar Square beginning in 2018.

Lamassu appear in the novel Magic Rises, the 6th book of the Kate Daniels series by Ilona Andrews.

Games
Lammasu [sic] and shedu are two distinct types of good-aligned creatures in the role-playing game Dungeons & Dragons, with lammasu having the bodies of winged lions and shedu depicted as human-headed winged bulls.

Lammasu appear in the Magic: The Gathering trading card game as the white card Hunted Lammasu in the Ravnica expansion, as well as the white card Venerable Lammasu found in the Khans of Tarkir expansion.

In the Games Workshop miniatures wargame, Warhammer Fantasy Battle, the Lamasu was a mount for the Chaos Dwarf army. It has since returned as part of the Storm of Magic expansion release.

A lammasu briefly appears in the Fablehaven series.

In the video game Heroes of Might and Magic VI, the lamasu [sic] is a recruitable elite creature of the necropolis faction (undead).

Lamassu is an enemy in the Neo Babylon levels of Spelunky 2, and in the Neo Babylon level set in the Cosmic Ocean section.

A Lamassu appears in Axiom Verge 2 as a godly machine, designed to protect against interlopers.

A Lamassu appears in Prince of Persia 3D at the end of the Floating Ruins level, where the prince rides on it to the Cliffs. It is also appears in the ending of the game, where the Prince and Princess ride it to an unknown destination.

The Lamassu is one of the character backgrounds in the role-playing game Troika!.

Gallery

See also

 Anzû (older reading: Zû), Mesopotamian monster
 Apis
 Buraq
 Centaur
 Cherubim
 Chimera, Greek mythological hybrid monster
 Enlil
 Griffin or griffon, lion-bird hybrid
 Harpy
 Jinn
 Kamadhenu, Hindu bovine goddess
 Lakhmu, Akkadian deity also known as Lammasu
 Manticore, Persian sphinx-like creature
 Mermaid
 Minotaur
 Mythological hybrid
 List of hybrid creatures in mythology
 Pamola, the Abenaki-origin indigenous American "winged-moose" spirit protecting Mount Katahdin
 Pegasus, winged stallion in Greek mythology
 Sharabha, Hindu mythology: lion-bird hybrid
 Simurgh, Iranian mythical flying creature
 Sphinx, mythical creature with lion's body and human head
 Thunderbird (mythology)
 Yali, Hindu mythological lion-elephant-horse hybrid
 Ziz, giant griffin-like bird in Jewish mythology

Citations

General references 
 Frankfort, Henri, The Art and Architecture of the Ancient Orient, Pelican History of Art, 4th ed 1970, Penguin (now Yale History of Art),

External links

 Webpage about the Šêdu in the Louvre Museum 

Mesopotamian deities
Mesopotamian legendary creatures
Human-headed mythical creatures
Mythological bovines
Lion deities
Horned deities
Sphinxes
Assyrian art and architecture
Sumerian art and architecture
Tutelary deities
Avian humanoids
Cattle deities